Pulaski is a village in Brown, Oconto, and Shawano counties in the U.S. state of Wisconsin. The population was 3,539 at the 2010 census. Of this, 3,321 were in Brown County, 218 in Shawano County, and none in Oconto County.

The Brown and Oconto County portions of Pulaski are part of the Green Bay Metropolitan Statistical Area.

History
The village was named after the Polish Revolutionary War general Casimir Pulaski, who was responsible for creating America's first cavalry.

Geography
Pulaski is located at  (44.669220, -88.236994).
Most of the village is located in Brown County, with only small portions extending north into Oconto County and west into Shawano County.

Climate

Demographics

2010 census
As of the census of 2010, there were 3,539 people, 1,418 households, and 934 families living in the village. The racial makeup of the village was 96.0% White, 0.3% African American, 1.2% Native American, 0.5% Asian, 0.7% from other races, and 1.3% from two or more races. Hispanic or Latino of any race were 1.9% of the population.

There were 1,418 households, of which 38.6% had children under the age of 18 living with them, 46.2% were married couples living together, 14.2% had a female householder with no husband present, 5.4% had a male householder with no wife present, and 34.1% were non-families. 29.5% of all households were made up of individuals, and 12.2% had someone living alone who was 65 years of age or older. The average household size was 2.46 and the average family size was 3.07.

The median age in the village was 33.6 years. 28.8% of residents were under the age of 18; 8.7% were between the ages of 18 and 24; 27.6% were from 25 to 44; 22.2% were from 45 to 64; and 12.6% were 65 years of age or older. The gender makeup of the village was 48.4% male and 51.6% female.

2000 census
As of the census of 2000, there were 3,060 people, 1,185 households, and 795 families living in the village. The population density was 1,225.4 people per square mile (472.6/km2). There were 1,254 housing units at an average density of 502.2 per square mile (193.7/km2). The racial makeup of the village was 97.35% White, 0.33% African American, 0.69% Native American, 0.72% Asian, 0.16% from other races, and 0.75% from two or more races. Hispanic or Latino of any race were 0.95% of the population.

There were 1,185 households, out of which 35.8% had children under the age of 18 living with them, 53.2% were married couples living together, 10.5% had a female householder with no husband present, and 32.9% were non-families. 27.4% of all households were made up of individuals, and 13.3% had someone living alone who was 65 years of age or older. The average household size was 2.55 and the average family size was 3.16.

In the village, the population was spread out, with 28.2% under the age of 18, 10.7% from 18 to 24, 30.6% from 25 to 44, 16.7% from 45 to 64, and 13.9% who were 65 years of age or older. The median age was 34 years. For every 100 females, there were 100.1 males. For every 100 females age 18 and over, there were 94.0 males.

The median income for a household in the village was $43,017, and the median income for a family was $53,281. Males had a median income of $34,811 versus $25,101 for females. The per capita income for the village was $18,711. About 5.5% of families and 6.9% of the population were below the poverty line, including 5.7% of those under age 18 and 14.6% of those age 65 or over.

Media
 Pulaski News

Recreation
Pulaski is host to the annual "Pulaski Polka Days", one of the largest festivals dedicated to the Polish in the United States. The festival draws polka bands from around the country. It closes with a Polka Day parade and traditional Polish Catholic Mass.

Notable people
Gary Drzewiecki, businessman, was born in Pulaski.
Harry Rozmiarek, veterinarian, was born in Pulaski.
Larry Treankler, founder of Bay Tek Entertainment.

References

External links

 Village of Pulaski
 Pulaski Chamber of Commerce
 Pulaski Community School District

Villages in Wisconsin
Villages in Brown County, Wisconsin
Villages in Oconto County, Wisconsin
Villages in Shawano County, Wisconsin
Green Bay metropolitan area